Khvor Chah (also Romanized as Khvor Chāh) is a village in Mehran Rural District, in the Central District of Bandar Lengeh County, Hormozgan Province, Iran. At the 2006 census, its population was 401, in 73 families.

References 

Populated places in Bandar Lengeh County